"Hand on Heart" is a song by English singer-songwriter Olly Murs for his third studio album Right Place Right Time (2012). The song was released as the fifth single from the album, although released to promote the 2013 re-release. It was co-written by Murs, Ben Kohn, Pete Kelleher, Tom Barnes, Wayne Hector and Iain James while the production was handled by TMS. Another version of the song was released in Spain with the Spanish pop singer Edurne collaborating.

Music video
A music video for the song was released on 4 November 2013. Inspired by the video to Robbie Williams' hit single "Angels", it was shot in black-and-white and directed by Vaughan Arnell, who shot the original video to "Angels".

Williams, who made a cameo appearance in the video, commented, "Imitation is the highest form of flattery. I am easily flattered, and I love Olly. We always have a good time together and this was no exception."

Live performances
Murs performed the song on the seventh live show of the tenth series of The X Factor, the seventeenth season of Dancing with the Stars, The Jonathan Ross Show, John Bishop's Christmas Show and the duet version featuring Spanish singer Edurne on "Los Premios 40 Principales" 2013 in Madrid.

Chart performance
On the week commencing 18 November 2013, "Hand on Heart" debuted and peaked at number 73 in Australia, becoming Murs' fourth song to enter the ARIA Singles Chart in 2013.

Credits and personnel 
Credits adapted from the liner notes of Right Place Right Time, Epic Records, Syco Records.
Recording
Produced at The Music Shed, London, England
Mixed at The Pierce Rooms, London, England

Personnel
Lead vocals – Olly Murs
Songwriting – Olly Murs, Ben Kohn, Pete Kelleher, Tom Barnes, Wayne Hector, Iain James
Production – TMS
Backing vocals – Wayne Hector, Iain James
Guitar – Ben Kohn
Drums – Tom Barns
Keyboards – Pete Kelleher
Mixing – Steve Fitzmaurice, Darren Heelis (assistant)

Charts

Duet version featuring Edurne

References 

Olly Murs songs
2013 singles
Black-and-white music videos
Pop ballads
Music videos directed by Vaughan Arnell
2013 songs
Songs written by Olly Murs
Songs written by Ben Kohn
Songs written by Peter Kelleher (songwriter)
Songs written by Tom Barnes (songwriter)
Songs written by Iain James
Songs written by Wayne Hector
Song recordings produced by TMS (production team)